Ranjanben Dhananjay Bhatt (born 10 August 1962) is an Indian politician and a member of the Bharatiya Janata Party. She has been a member of 16th and 17th Lok Sabha.

Career 
Bhatt was a Deputy Mayor of Vadodara. She is credited with running and heading the "Women's Club" for the last 22 years.

She was elected to the 16th Lok Sabha from the Vadodara constituency in the 2014 bye-elections. In the 16th Lok Sabha, Bhatt has been a member of the Consultative Committee, Ministry of Water Resources, River Development and Ganga Rejuvenation. From 2014 to 2016, she was a member of the Standing Committee on Health and Family Welfare. From 2016 to 2019, she was a member of the Standing Committee on Industry.

She was reelected to 17th Lok Sabha in the 2019 Indian general election from Vadodara constituency and was appointed a member of the Standing Committee on Railways.

References

Living people
India MPs 2014–2019
People from Vadodara
Lok Sabha members from Gujarat
Women in Gujarat politics
People from Bharuch district
1962 births
Ahmedabad municipal councillors
21st-century Indian women politicians
21st-century Indian politicians
Bharatiya Janata Party politicians from Gujarat
India MPs 2019–present